Events from the year 1722 in France

Incumbents
 Monarch – Louis XV
Regent: Philippe II, Duke of Orléans

Events
University of Burgundy established in Dijon.

Births
19 February – Charles-François Tiphaigne de la Roche, author (died 1774)
7 March – Louis-Jacques Goussier, illustrator (died 1799)
23 March – Jean-Baptiste Chappe d'Auteroche, astronomer (died 1769)
23 May – Claudius Franciscus Gagnières des Granges, Jesuit (massacred 1792)
14 July – Jean-Pierre du Teil, general (died 1794)
23 July
Anne-Catherine de Ligniville, Madame Helvétius, salon holder (died 1800)
Antoine Petit, physician (died 1794)
11 November – Nicolas Antoine Boulanger, philosopher (died 1759)
22 November – Marc Antoine René de Voyer, ambassador and Minister of War (died 1787)
1 December – Jean-Pierre de Bougainville, writer (died 1763)
4 December – Guillaume Piguel, French-born Apostolic Vicar of Cochin (died 1771)

Deaths

23 January – Henri de Boulainvilliers, nobleman and historian (born 1658)
4 May – Claude Gillot, painter, engraver, book illustrator, metal worker and theatrical designer (born 1673)
20 May – Sébastien Vaillant, botanist (born 1669)
23 May – Pierre Aveline, engraver (born 1656)
26 September – Guillaume Massieu, clergyman (born 1665)
Full date missing – Charles de Ferriol, ambassador (born 1652)

See also

References

1720s in France